Nicolò De Cesare (born 31 January 1990) is an Italian footballer who currently plays as a defender for Grottammare.

Career
Born in Ascoli Piceno, Marche, De Cesare started his career with Internazionale since 2004. He played for the team from Giovanissimi Nazionali to Allievi Nazionali team. In 2007–08 season, he left for the reserve of Pro Sesto along with Andrea Bavena, Samuele Beretta, Mattia Dell'Aera, Davide Tremolada, Fabio Perissinotto (since January) and Luca Profeta (since January). In the next season, he left for Monza along with Paolo Campinoti, Luca D'Errico, G.Kyeremateng, Domenico Maiese, Mirko Santoro, D.Tremolada, Stefano Tresoldi, Maximiliano Uggè, Niccolò Scaccabarozzi and Francesco Poltero (since January). Which De Cesare played for its senior youth team – Berretti and played once in Lega Pro Prima Divisione.

In August 2009, he was signed by Seconda Divisione club Mezzocorona.

Honours
Pro Sesto youth
Campionato Nazionale Dante Berretti: 2008

Monza youth
Campionato Nazionale Dante Berretti Runner-up: 2009

References

External links
 Mezzocorona Profile (2009–10 season) 
 

1990 births
Living people
Italian footballers
Inter Milan players
S.S.D. Pro Sesto players
A.C. Monza players
Association football midfielders
People from Ascoli Piceno
Sportspeople from the Province of Ascoli Piceno
Footballers from Marche